Town of Palatine is a town in Montgomery County, New York, United States.  It is located on the north side of the Mohawk River in the northwestern part of the county.  The population was 3,240 at the 2010 census, the highest since the 1820s. The name is derived from the Palatinate in the Rhineland, the homeland of the Germans who were the earliest European settlers of this region.  Administrative offices of the town are located in Palatine Bridge

History 
Settlers in this area in the mid-18th century were primarily German Palatines, ethnic Germans from the Palatinate. Suffering from French raids in their native territory, they had become refugees. Queen Anne of England arranged for the transport of several thousand Protestant Germans to the colony in 1710 and later; they first worked in camps run by the English along the Hudson River to pay off the cost of passage.

The Germans built the Palatine Church in 1770, which still holds Lutheran services. It was listed on the National Register of Historic Places in 1973.

The Town was formed in 1788 after the American Revolutionary War from the "Palatine District" in the newly organized Montgomery County. In 1797, part of the town was used to form the town of Salisbury (now in Herkimer County). The formation of other towns that eventually were in adjacent counties further reduced Palatine in size. The town of St. Johnsville was also created, in Montgomery County.

Geography

The Mohawk River forms the southern town line, and the northern town boundary  is the border of Fulton County, New York.

Demographics

As of the census of 2000, there were 3,070 people, 1,135 households, and 812 families residing in the town.  The population density was 74.5 people per square mile (28.8/km2).  There were 1,233 housing units at an average density of 29.9 per square mile (11.6/km2).  The racial makeup of the town was 97.82% White, 0.62% African American, 0.26% Native American, 0.52% Asian, 0.07% from other races, and 0.72% from two or more races. Hispanic or Latino of any race were 0.49% of the population.

There were 1,135 households, out of which 31.5% had children under the age of 18 living with them, 57.7% were married couples living together, 9.0% had a female householder with no husband present, and 28.4% were non-families. 24.5% of all households were made up of individuals, and 12.1% had someone living alone who was 65 years of age or older.  The average household size was 2.64 and the average family size was 3.10.

In the town, the population was spread out, with 26.4% under the age of 18, 7.2% from 18 to 24, 26.7% from 25 to 44, 21.3% from 45 to 64, and 18.4% who were 65 years of age or older.  The median age was 39 years. For every 100 females, there were 92.7 males.  For every 100 females age 18 and over, there were 91.1 males.

The median income for a household in the town was $33,415, and the median income for a family was $40,284. Males had a median income of $27,745 versus $22,978 for females. The per capita income for the town was $17,416.  About 6.9% of families and 11.5% of the population were below the poverty line, including 18.1% of those under age 18 and 7.3% of those age 65 or over.

Communities and locations in Palatine 
Big Nose – A landmark at the town line in the southeastern part of Palatine.  Along with "Little Nose" on the opposite bank of the Mohawk River, it marks a place called "The Noses."
Christmans Corners – A location in the northern section  of the town.
Cook Corners – A hamlet south of Stone Arabia on Route 10 at the intersection with Dillenbeck Road.  Location of Salem United. Methodist Church of East Stone Arabia and Historical site of School Number 6.
Cranes Landing – A former community in the western part of the town.
East Stone Arabia – A hamlet east of Stone Arabia.  Location of Salem United Methodist Church of East Stone Arabia. Historical location of School Number 6.
McKinley – A location in the southeastern part of the town. The Van Wie Farmstead was added to the National Register of Historic Places in 2011.
Nelliston – The Village of Nelliston is on the Mohawk River, opposite Fort Plain, New York.
Palatine Bridge – The Village of Palatine Bridge on the Mohawk River, opposite Canajoharie.  The Frey House, Palatine Bridge Freight House, and Webster Wagner House are listed on the National Register of Historic Places.
Palatine Church – A former community in the northwestern portion  of the town.
Stone Arabia – A hamlet on Route 10, northeast of Palatine Bridge. Home to a large Amish community.  Location of  the Trinity Lutheran Church and Cemetery and the nearby Reformed Dutch Church of Stone Arabia.  Site of Fort Paris.

References

External links
  Early Palatine history
 Official  Website

Towns in Montgomery County, New York
Palatine German settlement in New York (state)
1788 establishments in New York (state)
Populated places on the Mohawk River
Populated places established in 1788